The Science of Survival — Your Planet Needs You is the third exhibition project from The Science of..., a joint operation between the London Science Museum and Fleming Media. The exhibition launched at The Science Museum in April 2008 and two versions are on a worldwide tour.

Content overview
The Science of Survival looks at ways to ensure the survival of communities and lifestyles worldwide in the face of changing climate and resource availability. The exhibition uses current environmental research to show visitors how to create a sustainable city of the future.

The exhibition is accompanied by a website containing a cartoon builder, more information about the subjects covered and learning resources.

Development and opening 
The exhibition team worked with experts from academic institutes, NGOs and government advisory bodies during development. The exhibition was opened on 5 April 2008 by Dr Chris West, Director of the United Kingdom Climate Impacts Programme  and Ben Fogle.

The Exhibition is sponsored by BASF, HSBC and Nissan.

See also
Science Museum (London)
The Science of...

References

External links
The Science of Survival website
The Science Museum, London
The Science of...
The Exhibitions Agency Ltd.

Traveling exhibits
Sustainable urban planning
Climate change and society
Science exhibitions